Renier Vázquez Igarza (born 8 January 1979) is a Cuban-born Spanish chess player, who attained the rank of Grand Master in 2007. As of August 2014 he had a FIDE Elo rating of 2603 and was ranked 238th in the world.

He competed in the 41st Chess Olympiad in Norway in August 2014, finishing tenth with the Spanish team in the Open Event.

References

Spanish chess players
Chess grandmasters
1979 births
Living people